The 2018–19 Portland Pilots women's basketball team represents the University of Portland in the 2018–19 NCAA Division I women's basketball season. The Pilots were led by fifth year coach Cheryl Sorensen. They play their homes games at Chiles Center and were members of the West Coast Conference. They finished the season 13–17, 5–13 in WCC play to finish in eighth place. They lost in the first round of the WCC women's tournament to San Francisco.

On March 12, Cheryl Sorensen has agreed to parted ways. She finished at Portland with a 5 year record of 33–117. On March 27, former George Fox head coach Michael Meek as the new coach.

Roster

Schedule and results

|-
!colspan=9 style=| Exhibition

|-
!colspan=9 style=| Non-conference regular season

|-
!colspan=9 style=| WCC regular season

|-
!colspan=9 style=| WCC Women's Tournament

See also
 2018–19 Portland Pilots men's basketball team

References

Portland
Portland Pilots women's basketball seasons